Jari Veikko Sillanpää (born 16 August 1965) is a Finnish-Swedish singer. With over 820,000 records sold, he is the fifth-best-selling music artist and second-best-selling solo artist in Finland.

Life and career 
Born into a Sweden-Finnish family, Sillanpää spent his childhood in Sweden. His mother was one of the tens of thousands Finnish children who were evacuated to Sweden during World War II. Sillanpää's maternal great-grandfather, Potif Afanasief, and great-grandmother were Russians.

Sillanpää moved to Finland in the mid-1990s. He gained fame after winning the Seinäjoki Tangomarkkinat tango contest in 1995.

Sillanpää's 1996 debut album Jari Sillanpää is the best-selling album of all time in Finland, with over 270,000 copies sold.

In 1998, Sillanpää was awarded the Male Soloist of the Year Emma award.

Sillanpää represented Finland in Eurovision Song Contest 2004 and his song "Takes 2 to Tango" (which he wrote the lyrics for) received 51 points in the semi-final, taking the 14th place and not qualifying for the final. Sillanpää participated in the Finnish National Final for the Eurovision Song Contest 2009 with the song "Kirkas kipinä", making it to the final show, but finishing out of the final three.

A Swedish citizen by birth, Sillanpää also obtained Finnish citizenship in the early 2010s. In 2006 Sillanpää came out publicly as homosexual.

In August 2018, Sillanpää received a suspended 10-month sentence for buying methamphetamine. In early 2020, Sillanpää was on trial for having filmed a computer screen with his phone while a child sexual abuse video was playing on the computer. Sillanpää denied the charge and said someone else had used his phone. He was convicted and given a fine of more than 15,000 euros.

Discography 
Albums
 Jari Sillanpää (1996)
 Hyvää joulua (1996) – Christmas album
 Auringonnousu (1997)
 Varastetut helmet (1998)
 Onnenetsijä (1999)
 Maa on niin kaunis (2000) – Christmas album
 Hän kertoo sen sävelin (2001)
 Määränpää tuntematon (2003)
 Albumi (2008)
 Al Ritmo Latino (2008)
 Kuin elokuvissa (2009)
 Millainen laulu jää (2011)
 Rakkaudella merkitty mies (2014)

Compilation albums
 Kuninkaan kyyneleet (2000)
 Parhaat (2005)
 Kaikkien aikojen parhaat (2013)

Singles
 "Bum bum bum" (1997) 
 "Valkeaa unelmaa" (1998)
 "Lauluni" (1999)
 "Kuuleeko Eero?" (1999)
 "Lumilinna" (1999)
 "Sininen & punainen" (2001)
 "Takes 2 to Tango" (2004)
 "Vierellesi kaipaan" (with Katri Helena) (2007)
 "Liekeissä" (2012)

See also
List of best-selling music artists in Finland

References

External links 

Official website

1965 births
Living people
People from Ludvika Municipality
Eurovision Song Contest entrants for Finland
20th-century Finnish male singers
Eurovision Song Contest entrants of 2004
Gay singers
Finnish LGBT singers
Finnish gay musicians
Finnish tango musicians
Swedish expatriates in Finland
Swedish people of Finnish descent
Finnish people of Russian descent
Swedish people of Russian descent
Naturalized citizens of Finland
Swedish LGBT singers
Swedish gay musicians
20th-century LGBT people
21st-century LGBT people
21st-century Finnish male singers